Government College of Teacher Training in Dharamsala, Himachal Pradesh, India.

History
Government College of Teacher Education Dharamsala was founded in October 1956 to meet the growing demand of trained teachers for middle and secondary schools. It was affiliated with the Punjab University Chandigarh, but after the reorganization of states in India and the creation of Himachal Pradesh, the College was affiliated with Himachal Pradesh University (HPU) Shimla, a co-educational institution catering to the needs of pre-service teacher-trainees only.

In 1962 National Council of Educational Research and Training (NCERT) New Delhi established an extension center at the Government College, to cater to the growing needs of in-service teachers in the district of Chamba. The center grew to cater for the whole of Kangra (which included present-day Una and Hamirpur districts). This department disseminated information to in-service teachers in the fields of curriculum, methodology, evaluation and other similar fields in education, to continue their professional growth.

In 1994, the Ministry of Human Resource Development in New Delhi upgraded the "College of Education" to the "State College of Teacher Education". The college has blossomed into a "Center of Excellence" in teacher training programs for pre-service as well as in-service teaching. It is the only government institution in Himachal Pradesh which supplies trained teachers to all of Himachal Pradesh, and has contributed significantly towards meeting the manpower requirement of secondary schools.

See also 
 List of teacher education schools in India

References

External links
 Government College of Teacher Education

Colleges of education in India
Universities and colleges in Himachal Pradesh
Education in Dharamshala
Educational institutions established in 1956
1956 establishments in Himachal Pradesh